Coleophora seminalis is a moth of the family Coleophoridae. It is found in Australia (most areas of Queensland north of Yeppoon), New Guinea, Malesia (Java, Sumatra), Fiji and eastern China.

The wingspan is about 10 mm.

The larvae feed on Amaranthus species.

References

External links
Australian Faunal Directory
The families of Malesian moths and butterflies

Moths of Australia
seminalis
Moths of Asia
Moths described in 1921